is a Japanese athlete specialising in sprinting events. Sani Brown has a Japanese mother and a Ghanaian Dagomba father. Sani Brown won the 100 metres at the 2015 World Youth Championships in Athletics setting a championship record of 10.28 (−0.4) in the final.

Career
In Japan, Sani Brown ran for Josai High School, a private high school operated by the same corporation that operates Josai University in the Toshima ward of Tokyo. and qualified for the 2020 Tokyo Olympic Summer Games running 100 in 9.99 seconds on 12 May 2019.

Sani Brown finished as runner up at the 2015 Japanese senior National Championships in both the 100m and the 200m, but did not run a qualifying time for the world championships in either event. At the 2015 World Youth Championships in Athletics Sani Brown equalled his personal best of 10.30 in the 100m heats to set a new championship record before running 10.28 into a −0.3 headwind to improve that mark in the final. Three days later he doubled by winning the 200 metres in 20.34 into a −0.7 headwind. The time was .16 faster than the championship qualifying standard, thereby punching Sani Brown's ticket to the world championships as a sixteen year old.

At the 2015 World Championships Sani Brown qualified for the semi-final round against athletes who were at least three years his senior.

In 2016, he committed to the University of Florida. In the 2019 NCAA championships he set the former Japanese record at 9.97s. He was a member of the 4x100m relay team which won the NCAA Championship in 2019.

At the 2022 World Championships, he became the first person from Japan to qualify for the finals in the 100m, running 9.98 in the heats and 10.06 in the finals for seventh place.

References

External links
 
 
 
 
 

1999 births
Living people
Japanese male sprinters
World Athletics Championships athletes for Japan
World Athletics Championships medalists
Japan Championships in Athletics winners
Florida Gators men's track and field athletes
Japanese people of Ghanaian descent
Sportspeople of Ghanaian descent
Athletes (track and field) at the 2020 Summer Olympics
Olympic athletes of Japan
20th-century Japanese people
21st-century Japanese people